Shehzana Anwar (born 21 August 1989 in Nairobi) is a female Kenyan recurve archer. She competed in the archery competition at the 2016 Summer Olympics in Rio de Janeiro, where she was the Kenyan flagbearer. She was defeated by Ki Bo-bae of South Korea during the first round of the women's individual competition.

References

External links
 

Kenyan female archers
Living people
1989 births
Archers at the 2016 Summer Olympics
Olympic archers of Kenya
Sportspeople from Nairobi
Kenyan Muslims
Kenyan people of Indian descent